The 1955 Rice Owls football team represented Rice University during the 1955 college football season. The Owls were led by 16th-year head coach Jess Neely and played their home games at Rice Stadium in Houston, Texas. They competed as members of the Southwest Conference, finishing in last. Despite starting the year with high expectations, ranked 11th in the preseason AP Poll, the Owls had a disastrous season, finishing winless in conference and 2–7–1 overall. It was Rice's first losing season since 1945.

Schedule

References

Rice
Rice Owls football seasons
Rice Owls football